Bheemanapalle is a village in Uppalaguptam Mandal, Dr. B.R. Ambedkar Konaseema district in the state of Andhra Pradesh in India.

Geography 

Demographics 
 India census, Bheemanapalle had a population of 7733, out of which 3905 were male and 3828 were female. The population of children below 6 years of age was 10%. The literacy rate of the village was 78%.

References 

Villages in Uppalaguptam mandal